KROX-FM (101.5 MHz) is a commercial radio station licensed to Buda, Texas, and serving the Austin-Round Rock metropolitan area.  It is owned by Sinclair Telecable Inc. (not related to television broadcaster Sinclair Broadcast Group, who owns CBS station KEYE-TV) and broadcasts an alternative rock format.  The station has studios along Interstate 35 in North Austin, and the transmitter site is located off Waymaker Way at the West Austin Antenna Farm.

History

KGID Giddings
On May 10, 1984, Radio Lee County, Inc. received a construction permit from the Federal Communications Commission (FCC) to build a new FM radio station at 101.7 MHz.  It signed on as KGID, licensed to Giddings, Texas.

It broadcast at 3,000 watts, a quarter of its current power, from a tower located between Bastrop and La Grange.  That meant it could only cover the southeast communities of the Austin metro area, including the farming communities in and around Lee County. KGID aired a country music format, geared to listeners in this rural area of Texas.

KOKE-FM
The call sign switched to KOKE on April 6, 1990, changing to a Southern Gospel format.  Radio Lee County received permission from the FCC to switch the frequency to 101.5 MHz, boost the station's effective radiated power to 38,800 watts from a tower at 560 feet in height above average terrain.  This would have extended the station's reach into the more lucrative Austin radio market, however, Radio Lee County lacked the money to invest in the new tower and transmitter.

In 1995, Virginia-based Sinclair Telecable bought the station for $2.73 million.   It completed the rebuild, switching the call letters to KROX-FM, and moving the studios and offices to Barton Springs Road in Austin.

101X, Austin's New Rock Alternative
The new station took the moniker 101X.  It signed on as "Austin's New Rock Alternative" on June 8, 1995. Its main competition, at the beginning, was "K-Nack" 107.7 KNNC, the Austin market's original Alternative station.  Both KROX-FM and KNNC were hampered by poor signals with neither able to achieve significant ratings.  KNNC management decided to sell its station in January 1997.  The KNNC DJs were dismissed and until July 1997, KNNC simulcast KROX-FM.  Eventually, KNNC was sold and became classic rock "107.7 The Hawk."  Today it is Latin Adult Contemporary KLJA.

The original DJs on 101X included Sara Trexler, former KNNC personalities Rachel Marisay and Ray Seggern, LA Lloyd Hocutt, Gibby Haynes, a member of the punk rock group The Butthole Surfers, and Austin Chronicle music critic Andy Langer.  The morning show, "Jason and Deb," won the 2014 Austin Chronicle "Best Of" Poll.

In the late 1990s, 101X veered into active rock territory at the height of alternative radio's nu-metal period. It has since returned to a broader alternative presentation, closely associated with the local Austin music scene and today's indie rock.  In 1997, the station was sold to LBJS Broadcasting.  LBJS was originally owned by the family of "L.B.J." or former President Lyndon Baines Johnson.  That put KROX-FM into common ownership with KLBJ-FM, Austin's leading rock station, that specialized in mostly harder-edged classic rock.

In 2003, LBJS Broadcasting sold its radio stations to the Indianapolis-based Emmis Communications, including KROX-FM. Although Sinclair Telecommunications continued to own 49.9% of the stations, Emmis was the controlling partner.

In the early 2000s, KROX-FM's city of license changed from Giddings, Texas to Buda, Texas.

References

External links
 Official Website
Morning X
Facebook
Twitter
Hypersonic
101X Concert Calendar
101X Workforce
 Chillville
 No Control Radio

ROX-FM
Modern rock radio stations in the United States
Radio stations established in 1995